John O'Callaghan (?–1913) was National Secretary of the United Irish League and a staff writer on The Boston Globe.

References

1913 deaths
United Irish League
American male journalists
Year of birth missing